The Elgon francolin (Scleroptila elgonensis) is a francolin found in moorland at altitudes above  from eastern Uganda (Mount Elgon) to central Kenya.<ref name=KenyaTanzania>Zimmerman, D. A., Turner, D. A., & Pearson, D. J. (1999). Birds of Kenya & Northern Tanzania. Christopher Helm, London. </ref>Dickinson, E. C. eds. (2003). The Howard and Moore Complete Checklist of the Birds of the World. 3rd edition.  

It was described by Ogilvie-Grant in 1891 as Francolinus elgonensis, and some authorities still use the genus Francolinus for all members otherwise placed in Scleroptila. It was previously considered a subspecies of the moorland francolin (S. psilolaema), which is now thought to be endemic to Ethiopia. Alternatively, it was suggested as a subspecies of the Shelley's francolin (S. shelleyi elgonensis''), or even a hybrid between the moorland and red-winged francolins. However, it was split as a distinct species by the IUCN Red List and BirdLife International in 2014, and by the International Ornithological Congress in 2022 based on a 2019 study. The Elgon francolin resembles the moorland francolin, but the latter is duller (less rufescent) and has a black-dotted throat, and also differs in vocalizations.

References

Elgon francolin
Birds of East Africa
Elgon francolin